Wood Creek is a tributary of Oneida Lake in New York.

For other uses:

 Rural Municipality of Wood Creek No. 281, Saskatchewan, Canada
 Wood Creek (Champlain Canal tributary), in New York
 Wood Creek (Mohawk River tributary), in New York
 Wood Creek Lake, in Kentucky